"Where Did They Go" is a song written by Gloria Sklerov and Harry Lloyd. It was first recorded by American singer Peggy Lee, and later covered by the British singer Sandie Shaw, and the group, Blue Mink (two members of which together produced the Sandie Shaw version). In 1981, Diana Dors released a version in the UK on single, claiming at the time the song had been written specifically for her.

Year of song missing
Sandie Shaw songs